The Detroit Tradesmen is an American rugby union team based in Detroit. The flagship team plays in the Midwest Rugby Premiership with an additional team playing in Division III.

History
The club was founded in 1978.

References

External links
 

American rugby union teams
Rugby clubs established in 1978
1978 establishments in Michigan